John Leicester may refer to:
 John de Leicester, 13th-century bishop of Dunkeld
 John Leicester, 1st Baron de Tabley, English landowner, politician, amateur artist, and patron of the arts